Baursia is a section within the genus Philodendron that consists of 33 different species of plants. Philodendron species that are members of this section are typically described as having very prominent lateral veins. They also have elongated oblong leaves with a few species that are exceptions to this rule. Members of this section are usually found within southeastern South America and the upper amazon basin. The type species for this section is Philodendron crassinervium.  Additionally, philodendron within this section have plurilocular ovaries.

Philodendron in the section Baursia are often confused with those of the section Philopsammos since they both are characterized by having long elliptical leaves. The two can be distinguished however because philopsammos philodendron have bilocular ovaries.

References
Martius, Fl.Bras. 3(2): 134. 1878.
A. & C. de Candolle, Monog. Phanerog. 2: 387 (1879)
S. J. Mayo, "History and Infrageneric Nomenclature of Philodendron (Araceae)",Kew Bulletin, Vol. 45, No. 1 (1990), pp. 37–71 
Thomas B. Croat, "A Revision of Philodendron Subgenus Philodendron (Aracea) of Central America", Annals of the Missouri Botanical Garden, Vol. 84, No. 3 (1997), pp. 311–704.
J. C. French and P. B. Tomlinson, "Patterns of Stem Vasculature in Philodendron", American Journal of Botany, Vol. 71, No. 10 (Nov. - Dec., 1984), pp. 1432–1443 

Baursia
Plant sections